Saint-Germain-des-Fossés is a commune in the Allier department in Auvergne-Rhône-Alpes in central France. Saint-Germain-des-Fossés station has rail connections to Lyon, Nevers and Clermont-Ferrand.

Population

See also
Communes of the Allier department

References

Communes of Allier
Allier communes articles needing translation from French Wikipedia